David Samuel Carasso (born Salonica, Ottoman Empire) was a nineteenth-century Jewish traveler and writer. On the occasion of a business trip to Yemen, Arabia in 1874, he studied the situation of the Jews of that region. He published an account of his travels in a volume written in Judæo-Spanish, entitled Zikron Teman ó el Viage en el Yémen (Constantinople, 1875). He traversed the whole of the interior of Arabia, including Sada, Aseer, Sanaa, etc., and was especially interested in the last-named community. In order to ameliorate the condition of the Jews of Yemen, he wrote to the Anglo-Jewish Association and to the chief rabbi of Constantinople, Moses Halévy, whereupon the latter sent Isaac Saul, a rabbi of Constantinople, to Sanaa as chief rabbi.

References

Jewish writers
Jews from Thessaloniki
Jewish explorers
Sephardi Jews from the Ottoman Empire
19th-century writers from the Ottoman Empire
Year of birth missing
Year of death missing
Judaeo-Spanish-language writers
19th-century explorers